Miguel Ignacio Bernat (born 18 September 1957), is an Argentine chess International Master (IM) (1978), Pan American Junior Chess Championship winner (1977).

Biography
In the end of 1970s Miguel Bernat was one of Argentina's leading junior chess players. In 1976, Miguel Bernat participated in the Argentine Chess Championship final and shared 7th-10th place. In 1977, in Innsbruck he participated in World Junior Chess Championship. In the same year Miguel Bernat won Pan American Junior Chess Championship.

Miguel Bernat played for Argentina B team in the Chess Olympiad:
 In 1978, at first reserve board in the 23rd Chess Olympiad in Buenos Aires (+3, =2, -1).

Miguel Bernat played for Argentina in the World Youth U26 Team Chess Championship:
 In 1980, at second board in the 2nd World Youth U26 Team Chess Championship in Mexico City (+3, =3, -3) and won team bronze medal,
 In 1983, at second board in the 4th World Youth U26 Team Chess Championship in Chicago (+2, =4, -2).

References

External links

Miguel Bernat chess games at 365chess.com

1957 births
Living people
Sportspeople from Buenos Aires
Argentine chess players
Chess International Masters
Chess Olympiad competitors
20th-century chess players